Microlepidogaster discontenta is a species of armored catfish endemic to and found in the tributaries of the Rio São Francisco basin in Brazil.

References

Otothyrinae
Catfish of South America
Fish of Brazil
Endemic fauna of Brazil
Taxa named by Bárbara Borges Calegari
Taxa named by Ellen Viega da Silva
Taxa named by Roberto Esser dos Reis
Fish described in 2014